Mister Lonely is a 2007 comedy film directed by Harmony Korine and co-written with his brother Avi Korine. It features an ensemble cast of international actors, including Diego Luna, Samantha Morton, Denis Lavant, Werner Herzog, James Fox, Anita Pallenberg and Leos Carax. The film follows a Michael Jackson look-alike joining a commune filled with other impersonators as they build a stage to attract people to see them perform. Mister Lonely garnered mixed reviews from critics and was a box-office bomb, grossing $393,813 against an $8.2 million budget.

Plot
A young man living in Paris scratches out a living as a Michael Jackson look-alike, dancing on the streets, public parks, tourist spots and trade shows. During a show in a home for the elderly, he meets a Marilyn Monroe impersonator. Haunted by her angelic beauty, he follows her to a commune in the Scottish Highlands, joining her husband Charlie Chaplin, and her daughter Shirley Temple. Here, the Pope, Elizabeth II, Madonna, James Dean, and other impersonators build a stage in the hope that the world will visit and watch them perform.

A subplot concerns a convent in what seems to be a developing country. One of the nuns survives a fall from an airplane during a mission to deliver food to villages, and discovers that if you are true of heart, God will protect you. All the nuns then begin jumping from planes to show that they are true of heart and protected by God.

Cast
 Diego Luna as Michael Jackson
 Samantha Morton as Marilyn Monroe
 Denis Lavant as Charlie Chaplin
 Werner Herzog as Father Umbrillo
 James Fox as The Pope
 Anita Pallenberg as The Queen
 Melita Morgan as Madonna
 Jason Pennycooke as Sammy Davis, Jr.
Esmé Creed-Miles as Shirley Temple
 Leos Carax as Renard
 Britta Gartner as Nun
 Alisa Grace Greaves as Autograph girl
 Quentin Grosset as Le Petit Garçon
 Rachel Korine as Little Red Riding Hood
 Joseph Morgan as James Dean
 Richard Strange as Abraham Lincoln
 Daniel Rovai, Mal Whiteley, and Nigel Cooper as The Three Stooges: Moe Howard, Larry Fine, and Curly Howard
 Michael-Joel Stuart as Buckwheat
 David Blaine as Priest 2
 Angel Morgan as Various roles

Development
Korine conceived of a film about impersonators as a way to explore what he called "the obsessive nature" of the impersonator personality. Rather than mocking or belittling impersonation, Korine claims to have felt a "fondness and empathy" for impersonators since childhood.

Korine came up with the idea for the film after the release of Julien Donkey-Boy, but his drug use and general disillusionment (along with fund-raising difficulties) prolonged the process. In a February 2007 interview with Screen International, he said: "I'd been making movies since I was virtually a kid, and it had always come very easily. At a certain point after the last movie, I started to have this general disconnect from things. I was really miserable with where I was. I began to lose sight of things and people started to become more and more distant. I was burnt out, movies were what I always loved in life and I started to not care. I went deeper and deeper into a dark place and to be honest movies were the last thing I was thinking about – I didn't know if I was going to be alive. My dream was to evaporate. I was unhealthy. Whatever happened during that time, and I won't go into the details, maybe it was something I needed to go through." In a 2003 interview with the New York Post, former girlfriend Chloë Sevigny revealed that the formerly straight edge Korine had become addicted to heroin and methadone while they were together, with Korine's substance abuse issues contributing to the end of their relationship.

Richard Strange, who plays Abraham Lincoln, claimed that Korine often changed scenes and lines as filming progressed.

Production
While shooting the commune scenes, the cast and crew lived together in a Scottish castle (Duncraig Castle, Plockton), and many of the actors remained in their impersonated characters for all or part of the time they were off-camera. Actor Denis Lavant even bathed with his shoes on, as his impersonated character Charlie Chaplin was said to do.

To film the secondary storyline, Korine worked with real skydiving nuns from Spain, sometimes in temperatures of 48 °C (120 °F). Those scenes were filmed in Panama (as specified in the movie's credits).

Soundtrack
Half of the music was written and performed by Sun City Girls, with the other half being created by Spiritualized frontman, Jason "Spaceman" Pierce.

 "Michael's Opening" (dialogue)
 Spank Rock – "Backyard Betty"
 Jason Spaceman – "Blues 1"
 Jason Spaceman – "Blues 2 (Intro)"
 Sun City Girls – "3D Girls"
 Jason Spaceman – "Panama 1"
 Sun City Girls – "Spook"
 Jason Spaceman – "Garden Walk"
 Sun City Girls – "Steppe Spiritual"
 Jason Spaceman – "Pope in the Bath"
 Daniel Rovai – "Red River Valley"
 "Nun's Prayer" (dialogue)
 Sun City Girls – "Mr. Lonely Viola"
 Sun City Girls – "Beryl Scepter"
 "Red Riding Hood's Hangman" (dialogue)
 Jason Spaceman – "Stooges Harmonica"
 "Father Umbrillo's Broken Nation"
 Jason Spaceman – "Musicbox Underwater"
 Sun City Girls – "Circus Theme"
 Sun City Girls – "Vine Street Piano"
 Jason Spaceman – "Paris Beach"
 Sun City Girls – "Farewell"
 Angel Morgan – "Gold Dust"
 Aphex Twin – "Btoum-Roumada"

The movie also features "13 Angels Standing Guard 'Round the Side of Your Bed" by A Silver Mt. Zion and Bobby Vinton's "Mr. Lonely" (after which the film is titled), though neither song is  included on the soundtrack.
The Maid Freed From the Gallows by John Jacob Niles. My Life by Iris Dement.

Reception
Korine's largest film to date with a budget of $8.2 million, Mister Lonely earned $386,915 in its first nine months — $167,396 in the United States and $219,519 in other territories.

The site's consensus states: "Less biting or offensive than Korine's earlier works, this frustratingly dull film still maintains the director's trademark odd beauty." On Metacritic, the movie has a score of 53 out of 100, based on 22 critics, indicating "mixed or average reviews".

A.O. Scott of The New York Times praised Luna and Morton for performing "without cuteness or camp" in their roles and Korine's "richly colored, wide-frame compositions" throughout the film but gave note that the incoherent story will cause viewers to find his filmmaking style "frustratingly hermetic" and "morbidly preoccupied" with "expressive [power of] pictures than [in] conventional psychology." He concluded that: "And yet "Mister Lonely," self-enclosed though it may be, nonetheless demonstrates that Mr. Korine, who showed his ability to shock and repel in earlier films, also has the power to touch, to unsettle and to charm. This is undoubtedly a small movie, but it's also more than that: it's a small, imperfect world." Marjorie Baumgarten of The Austin Chronicle called the movie "Korine's most accessible as a director", noting that it featured "stirring and unforgettable" characters and imagery that "go[es] from poignant to comic and back again" when following the impersonators and the nuns, concluding that: "What does it all mean? I'm not sure. But ye of little faith – in either God's abiding power or one's own self-image – seem destined to come crashing down." Paste contributor Alissa Wilkinson wrote that: "Well-acted and at times funny, the imaginative premise dances around a great potential for profundity. Unfortunately, it succumbs to a spectacularly simplistic ending that will leave viewers empty and annoyed. Besotted with its own playfulness, Mister Lonely gives off the distinct impression that it was a lot more fun to make than it is to watch."

Jeremiah Kipp of Slant Magazine was initially positive during the film's "vaudevillian" opening for maintaining the "free-form narrative style" of Korine's previous efforts, but felt the Scottish Isle scenes came across like a continuous "parade of skits". He admitted that Korine was still "one of the most innovative and surprising new voices in American cinema", concluding that: "As a champion for the beautiful and the strange, I'll take bottom-shelf Korine over just about anything else currently playing in theaters." Carina Chocano of the Los Angeles Times commended Luna and Morton for being "enormously likable and engrossing" in their roles and the nuns' tale for having "a straightforward, realistic quality" to it, but felt the rest of the film lacked "emotional involvement" and "sustained attention" during the commune scenes, concluding that "while it's full of arresting, indelible images, "Mr. Lonely" remains mostly on the level of abstraction. You get it but you don't always feel it." Roger Ebert of the Chicago Sun-Times wrote that: "Harmony Korine's "Mister Lonely" is an odd, desperate film, lost in its own audacity, and yet there are passages of surreal beauty and preposterous invention that I have to admire. The film doesn't work, and indeed seems to have no clear idea of what its job is, and yet (sigh) there is the temptation to forgive its trespasses simply because it is utterly, if pointlessly, original." Kyle Smith of the New York Post wrote that: "Occasionally there is a striking image or a moment of wounded sweetness, but mainly the film provides ample proof that it's possible to be bizarre and boring at the same time."

References

External links
 
 
 
 
 

2007 films
2007 comedy-drama films
2000s American films
2000s British films
2000s French films
American comedy-drama films
American independent films
British comedy-drama films
British independent films
Cultural depictions of Charlie Chaplin
Cultural depictions of Elizabeth II
Cultural depictions of James Dean
Cultural depictions of Madonna
Cultural depictions of Michael Jackson
Cultural depictions of Sammy Davis Jr.
Cultural depictions of Shirley Temple
English-language French films
English-language Irish films
Fictional depictions of Abraham Lincoln in film
Film4 Productions films
Films about entertainers
Films directed by Harmony Korine
Films set in Paris
Films shot in Highland (council area)
Films shot in Panama
Films shot in Paris
French comedy-drama films
French independent films
Irish independent films